John Hobbs may refer to:
John Hobbs (ornithologist) (1920–1990), police officer and ornithologist
John Hobbs (baseball) (born 1956), Major League Baseball pitcher
John Raymond Hobbs (1929–2008), professor of chemical immunology
John Hobbs (missionary) (1800–1883), New Zealand missionary, artisan and interpreter
John Hobbs (cricketer, born 1935), English cricketer
John Hobbs, a county sheriff in Southeast Missouri in 1942
Jack Hobbs (John Berry Hobbs, 1882–1963), English cricketer

See also
Jack Hobbs (disambiguation)